The year 2007 is the 1st year in the history of Palace Fighting Championship, a mixed martial arts promotion based in the United States. In 2007 PFC held 5 events beginning with, PFC 1: King of the Ring.

Events list

PFC 1: King of the Ring

PFC 1: King of the Ring was an event held on January 18, 2007 at the Tachi Palace in Lemoore, California, United States.

Results

PFC 2: Fast and Furious

PFC 2: Fast and Furious was an event held on March 22, 2007 at the Tachi Palace in Lemoore, California, United States.

Results

PFC 3: Step Up

PFC 3: Step Up was an event held on July 19, 2007 at the Tachi Palace in Lemoore, California, United States.

Results

PFC 4: Project Complete

PFC 4: Project Complete was an event held on October 18, 2007 at the Tachi Palace in Lemoore, California, United States.

Results

PFC 5: Beatdown at 4 Bears

PFC 5: Beatdown at 4 Bears was an event held on November 10, 2007 at the 4 Bears Casino and Lodge in New Town, North Dakota.

Results

See also 
 Palace Fighting Championship

References

Palace Fighting Championship events
2007 in mixed martial arts